Abu Bakr Abdullah al-Qirbi is a Yemeni diplomat who was Minister of Foreign Affairs of Yemen from 2001 to 2014.

On 13 December 2009, al-Qirbi urged Iran's government to crack down on Iranian groups who he accused of aiding Houthi rebels in northern Yemen, holding the Iranian government partly to blame. According to al-Qirbi, "religious (Shiite) circles and groups in Iran are providing aid to the Houthis"; however, Iran repeatedly denied such accusations.

Following the anti-government protests in Yemen, President Ali Abdullah Saleh dismissed all members of the Cabinet of Yemen on March 20, 2011. They were to remain as serving members until a new government was formed.

On 4 October 2016, during the civil war, he was appointed as foreign minister in Abdel-Aziz bin Habtour's cabinet.

Honours

Foreign honours
 
  Two Sicilian Royal Family: Knight Commander of the Royal Order of Francis I

References

1942 births
Living people
Yemeni Sunni Muslims
Foreign ministers of Yemen
Alumni of the University of Edinburgh
21st-century Yemeni politicians
Yemeni diplomats
People from Al Bayda Governorate
General People's Congress (Yemen) politicians
Members of the Consultative Assembly of Yemen